Spilarctia tamangi is a moth in the family Erebidae. It was described by Thomas in 1994. It is found in the Indian states of Sikkim and Assam.

References

Moths described in 1994
tamangi